Neşerek Kadın  ("joy" or "wild rose"; 1848 - 11 June 1876), born Nesrin Zevş-Barakay Hanim, was a consort of Sultan Abdulaziz of the Ottoman Empire.

Early life
Of Circassian origin, Neşerek Kadın (called also Nesrin Kadın or Nesteren Kadın) was the daughter of Gazi Ismail Bey Zevş-Barakay. She was born to Sochi in 1848. She had two brothers, Hasan Bey (1850 – 1876), and Osman Pasha (1851 – 1892). Her aunt was the wife of Ateş Mehmed Pasha. Her birth name was Nesrin Zevş-Barakay Hanim.

Marriage
Neşerek married Abdulaziz in 1868 at the Dolmabahçe Palace, and was given the title of "Fourth Kadın". She gave birth to her first child, a son, Şehzade Mehmed Şevket on 5 June 1872. Two years later, on 24 August 1874, she gave birth to her second child, a daughter, Emine Sultan. In 1875, she was elevated to the title of "Third Kadın".

Abdulaziz was deposed by his ministers on 30 May 1876, his nephew Murad V becoming the Sultan. He was transferred to Feriye Palace the next day. The women of Abdulaziz's entourage didn't want to leave the Dolmabahçe Palace. So they were grabbed by hand and were sent out to the Feriye Palace. In the process, they were searched from head to toe and everything of value was taken from them. Neşerek was forcibly taken out of the palace by Prime Aide Sami Bey, wearing only a shawl, apparently because she had tried to hide royal jewels inside her clothes. Because of the horrible weather of that night, she fell ill and was carried on a stretcher to the caique, that was to take her to the Feriye Palace. Someone even snatched the shawl that was wrapped around her. On 4 June 1876, Abdulaziz died under mysterious circumstances.

Death
Neşerek Kadın died seven days after Abdulaziz's death on 11 June 1876 at the Feriye Palace seriously ill since the night of the deposition and shattered by sadness for Abdülaziz's death and convinced that he had been murdered. According to historian Alan Palmer, she instead apparently died in childbirth, however there not trace in sources of a her third child or pregnancy. Her son was welcomed by Abdülhamid II, the new sultan and grandson of Abdülaziz, and her daughter by Şehzade Yusuf Izzeddin, Abdülaziz's eldest son. She was buried in the mausoleum of imperial ladies, located at New Mosque, Istanbul.

Four days after her death, on 15 June 1876, her brother, Hasan Bey attempted to assassinate a large number of ministers meeting at the mansion of Midhat Pasha, perphaps to avenge her sister. He was tried, and executed on 18 June 1876.

Issue

See also
Kadın (title)
Ottoman Imperial Harem
List of consorts of the Ottoman sultans

Annotations

References

Sources

 

 

1876 deaths
People from Sochi
19th-century consorts of Ottoman sultans
People from the Ottoman Empire of Circassian descent
Deaths in childbirth